The House of Three Girls may refer to:

 The House of Three Girls (1918 film), a German silent film 
 The House of Three Girls (1958 film), an Austrian-West German musical film

See also
Das Dreimäderlhaus (disambiguation)